Mariko Ebralidze (born 1984) is a Georgian jazz singer who represented her country in the Eurovision Song Contest 2014 along with the group The Shin with the song "Three Minutes to Earth".

Born in Tbilisi, Ebralidze studied at the Zakaria Paliashvili music college and the Pedagogical Institute of Music Arts, and received a bachelor's degree as a soloist and teacher in 2008. She had gained popularity in Georgia as a jazz singer. Since 2008, Ebralidze has been a soloist at the Tbilisi Municipality orchestra Big Band.

References

1984 births
Living people
21st-century women singers from Georgia (country)
Musicians from Tbilisi
Eurovision Song Contest entrants of 2014
Eurovision Song Contest entrants for Georgia (country)